John Barnes (17 July 1868 – 31 January 1938) was a union official and Australian federal politician representing the Labor Party.

Early life
Barnes was born at Hamilton, South Australia, the son of John Thomas Barnes, a drover who had emigrated from Somerset, England, and his wife, Mary, née Comerford, from County Clare, Ireland. Barnes was educated at a local primary school but left to obtain work as a farm labourer, shearer, miner and general bush worker; his father had died when the boy was six. In his swag he carried copies of works by Henry George, Robert Blatchford, Henry Lawson and other writers on economic and social questions and he thus became largely self-educated.

Career
Barnes was an early member of the Shearers' Union, (later named the Australian Workers' Union), became General Secretary in 1908 and afterwards President. He was Secretary of the Victoria-Riverina branch for a period, and held that position when he was elected a federal Senator for Victoria in 1913. He was defeated at the 1919 general election but was again elected in 1922 and in 1928. He was Assistant Minister for Works and Railways from 22 October 1929 to 3 March 1931 and then Vice-President of the Executive Council and Leader of the Government in the Senate until 6 January 1932. He was then Leader of the Opposition in the Senate until 30 June 1935. Though he held his seat until this date, he had been defeated at the general election held in 1934. He was re-elected to the Senate in 1937, his term due to begin on 1 July 1938.

Late life and legacy
Barnes, however was suffering from cancer and died in East Melbourne on 31 January 1938 as a senator-elect. He left a widow, one son and five daughters. He was given a state funeral, the procession travelling through the city, pausing at Trades Hall, and continuing to the Melbourne General Cemetery.

Barnes, at the time, was the most notorious practical joker in Australian federal politics. His sense of humour went along with earnestness and a belief in the cause of Labour. He was well regarded amongst colleagues and in union circles, where he was for many years a leader before entering politics.

References

1868 births
1938 deaths
Australian Labor Party members of the Parliament of Australia
Members of the Australian Senate for Victoria
Members of the Australian Senate
Members of the Cabinet of Australia
Australian trade union leaders
20th-century Australian politicians